Plestiodon capito, commonly known as Gail's eyelid skink, is a species of lizard, a member of the Plestiodon skinks, and endemic to China.

References

Plestiodon
Reptiles of China
Reptiles described in 1879
Taxa named by Marie Firmin Bocourt